The First Nations Health Authority (FNHA) is a health service delivery organization responsible for administering a variety of health programs and service for First Nations people living in BC.

Overview
The FNHA is part of a First Nations Health Governance Structure in BC that includes the First Nations Health Council and First Nations Health Directors Association. The First Nations Health Authority emerged from a number of Tripartite agreements between BC First Nations, the Province of BC, and the Government of Canada that included the Transformative Change Accord: First Nations Health Plan [2006], Tripartite First Nations Health Plan [2007], and the Tripartite Framework Agreement on First Nations Health Governance.
A first for Canada, the FNHA is the first province-wide First Nations Health Authority in Canada. The FNHA plans, designs, manages and funds the delivery of First Nations health programs and services in BC. These community-based services are largely focused on health promotion and disease prevention - such as:
 Primary Care Services
 Mental Health and Addictions Programming
 Health Infrastructure
 Environmental Health and Research
 Non-Insured Health Benefits

The FNHA strives to improve First Nations health outcomes and close the gaps that exist between First Nations people in BC and the rest of the provincial population. The FNHA serves both the urban and rural First Nations population that includes 203 communities throughout the province.

On October 1, 2013 the FNHA completed the second phase transfer of federal programs and services from Health Canada.

Drinking water advisories
Drinking water advisories include Boil Water Advisory (BWA), Do Not Consume (DNC), and Do Not Use (DNU) are put in place by the FNHA's Environmental Public Health Services (EPHS). 
FNHA in British Columbia monitors 285 community water systems in 193 First Nations in British Columbia. In 2011, 11 long term advisories that had lasted longer than 12 months, were lifted. In 2016 and in 2017, 7 long term advisories were lifted. By January 31, 2019 there were 10 Drinking Water Advisories in effect across 8 First Nation communities.

See also

Regional health authorities in British Columbia

 Vancouver Coastal Health
 Fraser Health
 Interior Health
 Island Health
 Northern Health

Province-wide health authorities in British Columbia

 Provincial Health Services Authority

References

External links 
 http://www.fnha.ca
 http://www.fnhda.ca
 http://www.fnhc.ca

Medical and health organizations based in British Columbia
First Nations organizations in British Columbia
Indigenous health in Canada